John Kenton Britten (1 August 1950 – 5 September 1995) was a New Zealand mechanical engineer who designed a world-record-setting motorcycle with innovative features and materials.

Biography
John Britten was born to Bruce and Ruvae Britten in Christchurch at 10 minutes to midnight. His twin sister Marguerite was born just after midnight, so although they were twins they celebrated their birthdays on different dates. Being dyslexic, he needed to have exam questions read to him at school and during his tertiary education, and his answers recorded by a writer, but that didn't stop him from developing into a remarkable engineer and architectural designer.

His childhood heroes were notable fellow New Zealanders, Richard Pearse (pioneer aviator), Bill Hamilton (father of the jet boat), Bruce McLaren (champion driver and founder of the McLaren Formula One Team), and Burt Munro (world record motorcycle speedster and subject of the film The World's Fastest Indian). In his own short lifetime, Britten was regularly and favourably compared with all of his heroes.

Britten completed a four-year mechanical engineering course at night school before joining ICI as a cadet draughtsman, giving him a wide range of work experience including mould design, pattern design, metal spinning and various mechanical engineering designs.

Britten travelled to England where he worked for four months with Sir Alexander Gibb & Partners on a highway design linking the M1 motorway to the M4 motorway.

Back in New Zealand he was design engineer for Rowe Engineering, designing off-road equipment and heavy machinery. In 1976, he built glass kilns and went into business as a fine artist designing and making hand-made glass lighting, later joining the family property management and development business. In 1978, Britten and his wife bought a historic residence in Matai Street, Riccarton, that they spent the next six years renovating. As of 2018, one of their daughters lived in the house with her family.

In February 1995 John Britten was elected to the Institution of Professional Engineers New Zealand (now Engineering New Zealand) as an Honorary Fellow,  "in recognition of his outstanding contribution to the advancement of the science and profession of engineering".

Britten designed
Britten worked on motorcycle design for some years, developing innovative methods using composite materials and performance engine designs. He created  the Britten Motorcycle Company in 1992 to produce machines to his own design made of light materials and using engines that he had built himself, which became famous around the world.

His Britten motorcycles won races and set numerous speed records on the international circuits, and astounded the motorcycle world in 1991 when they finished second and third against the factory machines in the Battle of the Twins at Daytona, United States of America.

One of Britten's motorcycles is on permanent display at the Museum of New Zealand Te Papa Tongarewa in Wellington, New Zealand.

Death
Diagnosed with an inoperable skin cancer related illness, he died on 5 September 1995 just over a month after his forty-fifth birthday. His funeral at Christchurch Cathedral was attended by over one thousand mourners and he was widely mourned throughout New Zealand.

Motorcycle

Only 10 Britten V1000 and Britten V1100 motorcycles, not including 1 prototype, were ever constructed.

Britten's designs included:
Carbon fibre body work including wheels, front suspension fork, and swingarm
Hand cast, 4 valves per cylinder alloy engine
Frame-less chassis with engine acting as a stressed member 
Radiator located under the rider's seat
Carbon fibre fasteners (joining bodywork together)
Rear suspension shock located in front of engine
Engine data logging.

Non-Britten Components:
Tyres 
Brakes
Steel cylinder liners
Gearbox (sourced from a Suzuki)
Suspension shocks
Various electrical components.

References

Further reading

External links

Britten Motorcycle Company
Britten – Backyard Visionary a full-length documentary from 1993 on NZ On Screen
Biography of John Britten from the Museum of New Zealand Te Papa Tongarewa
John Britten and the Superbike from Christchurch City Library
NZ Edge – John Britten Maverick genius of motorcycle design

1950 births
1995 deaths
Burials at Waimairi Cemetery
Motorcycle designers
New Zealand industrial designers
20th-century New Zealand inventors
World record setters in motorcycling
People from Christchurch
People associated with the Museum of New Zealand Te Papa Tongarewa